Stefan Vujić (born 6 July 1991) is a Croatian-born Serbian handball player for Minaur Baia Mare and the Serbian national team.

International honours  
EHF Cup:  
Finalist: 2013

National team 
 Mediterranean Games
 Runners-up: 2013 (with Croatia)

References

External links

1991 births
Living people
Serbs of Croatia
Handball players from Rijeka
Serbian male handball players
Expatriate handball players 
Serbian expatriate sportspeople in France
Serbian expatriate sportspeople in Romania
RK Zagreb players
CSA Steaua București (handball) players
CS Dinamo București (men's handball) players
Mediterranean Games silver medalists for Croatia
Mediterranean Games medalists in handball
Competitors at the 2013 Mediterranean Games